Negera bimaculata is a moth in the family Drepanidae. It was described by William Jacob Holland in 1893. It is found in Cameroon, Gabon, Ghana and Liberia.

References

Moths described in 1893
Drepaninae
Moths of Africa